Claude Herbulot (19 February 1908 – 19 January 2006) was a French entomologist. He was born in Charleville-Mézières and died in Paris. He was a lepidopterist and specialised in moths in the family Geometridae. His collection is housed at the Zoologische Staatssammlung München.

His life 
He was born in Charleville-Mézières in 1908 in the Ardennes and his earliest works were on the lepidopteran fauna of the district. Later in his life he visited many afrotropical and oriental countries and spent time in Madagascar studying the fauna and describing about one third of the geometrid species of the island.
He was portrayed in his obituary as 
... a nice, clever, cultured person and an active, highly competent lepidopterist.
A biography has been published by one of his friends, Philippe Darge.

Works 
His best known works include Volumes I and II (Moths) of the Lepidoptera of France, Belgium and Switzerland which was published in 1948 and 1949.
The list of his 286 works is provided by the Munich Museum

Honours
He was elected president of the Société entomologique de France in 1953.
He was awarded the Spix Medal in 1999 and the Jacob Hübner Award in 2002.

Genera and species he described
He described 950 taxa. The complete list should be published soon.

Genera
30 genera are attributed to Claude Herbulot, of which 28 are valid:

 Anticleora Herbulot, 1966
 Antilurga Herbulot, 1951
 Antozola Herbulot, 1992
 Archirhoe Herbulot, 1951
 Catarhoe Herbulot, 1951
 Dargeia Herbulot, 1977
 Darisodes Herbulot, 1972
 Dorsifulcrum Herbulot, 1979
 Dyschlorodes Herbulot, 1966
 Dysrhoe Herbulot, 1951
 Glaucorhoe Herbulot, 1951
 Grammorhoe Herbulot, 1951
 Hyalinometra Herbulot, 1972
 Hydatopsis Herbulot, 1968
 Klinzigidia Herbulot, 1982
 Malgassapeira Herbulot (cited in the literature but has never been published)
 Malgassorhoe Herbulot, 1955
 Malgassothisa Herbulot 1966
 Microlyces Herbulot 1981
 Mimaplasta Herbulot 1993
 Orbamia Herbulot 1966
 Paramathia Herbulot 1948
 Pareulype Herbulot, 1951
 Parortholitha Herbulot, 1955
 Protorhoe Herbulot, 1951
 Pseudolarentia Herbulot, 1955
 Rougeotiana Herbulot, 1983
 Rougeotiella Herbulot, 1984 (in replacement of Rougeotiana, a name already used by Bernard Laporte to designate a new genus of Noctuidae)
 Steganomima Herbulot, 1972
 Toulgoetia Herbulot, 1946

List of taxa
A list of about 400 of the taxa he created, fully referenced, is given elsewhere

Entomological terms named after him 
The Munich museum lists the 4 genera and 29 species described

References

Presidents of the Société entomologique de France
French taxonomists
1908 births
2006 deaths
French lepidopterists
20th-century French zoologists